Heartstrings is the debut studio album by American singer-songwriter and actress Leighton Meester. It was released on October 28, 2014 by Vagrant and Hotly Wanting. Meester wrote all nine tracks featured on the record by herself, and the album was produced by Jeff Trott. Following its release, Heartstrings received generally positive reviews.

Promotion

Singles
"Heartstrings" was released as first single from album on September 9, 2014 via iTunes and SoundCloud. On October 17, 2014, Meester performed "Heartstrings" on Big Morning Buzz Live. On October 28, 2014, Heartstrings release party took place in Los Angeles at The Troubadour. The music video for Heartstrings was released on October 29, 2014.

Tour
In support of the album, Meester embarked on tour across North America, which began on January 6, 2015 in Los Angeles, California and ended on March 2, 2015 in San Francisco, California.

Commercial performance
The album debuted on week dated of November 15, 2014, at number 1 on the Billboard Heatseekers Albums and at number 139 on the official Billboard 200.

Track listing

Personnel
All credits adapted from the album's liner notes.
 Leighton Meester – vocals, composer
 Matt Chamberlain – drums, percussion
 Paul Bryon – bass
 Joel Shearer – guitar
 Dave Palmer – organ, keyboards
 Patrick Warren – orchestration, accordion, keyboards, piano
 Ryan Petersen – drum programming, percussion, additional keyboards
 Jeff Trott – bass, mandolin, keyboards, additional guitars, producer, engineer
 Shawn Everett – engineer
 John Cranfield – mixing
 Shahine Ezell – management

Charts

Release history

References

2014 debut albums
Leighton Meester albums
Vagrant Records albums
Albums produced by Jeff Trott